Places
 Mohri, Kurukshetra, a village in Kurukshetra district of Haryana state of India
 
People and fictional characters that have the name include
Mamoru Mohri, an astronaut
Mehryar Mohri, a computer scientist

See also
 Mohri, HINDU lower cast  family name

Surnames